Ghulam Sanay (born 5 May 1957) is a former Afghanistan wrestler, who competed at the 1980 Summer Olympic Games in the Greco-Roman featherweight event.

References

Wrestlers at the 1980 Summer Olympics
Afghan male sport wrestlers
Olympic wrestlers of Afghanistan
1957 births
Living people
Place of birth missing (living people)